Dubrovinskaya is a rural locality (a village) in Mishutinskoye Rural Settlement, Vozhegodsky District, Vologda Oblast, Russia. The population was 37 as of 2002.

Geography 
Dubrovinskaya is located 67 km east of Vozhega (the district's administrative centre) by road. Mishutinskaya is the nearest rural locality.

References 

Rural localities in Vozhegodsky District